Rentwertshausen is a former municipality in the district Schmalkalden-Meiningen, in Thuringia, Germany. From December 1, 2007, it is part of Grabfeld.

Former municipalities in Thuringia
Duchy of Saxe-Meiningen